Aggijjat (Inuktitut syllabics: ᐊᒡᒋᔾᔭᑦ) formerly Durban Island is a Canadian Arctic island located in Nunavut, Canada. It is one of Baffin Island's northeast offshore islands within Davis Strait's Merchants Bay. Durban Harbour is on the island's southeast facing side. Nearby can be found the larger Paallavvik, and Auyuittuq National Park is also to the west on Baffin Island.

History
Durban Island (FOX-E) is a former Distant Early Warning Line and is currently a North Warning System site.

It is listed by the Contaminated Sites Directorate in Iqaluit as a contaminated site in need of future remediation.

References

Islands of Baffin Island
Islands of Davis Strait
Uninhabited islands of Qikiqtaaluk Region
Former populated places in the Qikiqtaaluk Region